The Balec Mosque is named after the neighborhood of Gjilan, Kosovo, where it was built in 1905, at the time on the outskirts of the city.

It was built by Hysen Pasha Milla as his endowment or  waqf. The minaret dates to a 1973–74 renovation. There was no ablution fountain or shadirvan, but a water pump is nearby.

The mosque was demolished for rebuilding in 2016 and is still under reconstruction.

References

Mosques in Kosovo
Mosques completed in 1905
Gjilan
Buildings and structures in Gjilan